Citadel Island is a small, rugged, granite island in the Glennie group of islands off the west coast of Wilsons Promontory, Victoria, Australia.   It is the site of the first automatic acetylene powered lighthouse installed by Australia's Commonwealth Lighthouse Service.  There is no public access.  The island is part of the Wilsons Promontory Islands Important Bird Area, identified as such by BirdLife International because of its importance for breeding seabirds.

References

External links
 Port Albert Maritime Museum

Islands of Victoria (Australia)
Important Bird Areas of Victoria (Australia)